Dangle, dangler or dangling may refer to:

 Dangler (plot device), an unresolved plot line in a story
 Dangle (espionage), an agent of one side who pretends to be interested in defecting to another side 
 Dangle, a type of earring
 Dangle, in ice hockey, a variety of moves where a player dekes (fakes) out a goalie or player (it originally meant to skate fast with the puck)
 Dangle, in lacrosse, a complete defeat of a defender or goalie achieved by performing complex stick moves and tricks

People with the surname
 Lloyd Dangle, American writer and artist
 Lt. Jim Dangle, a Reno 911! character

See also
 Dangling modifier (or dangling participle), a type of misplaced grammatical phrase
 Dangling pointer (computing), a pointer not pointing to a valid object